Sir Alexander Fred Markham, born 1950, is Professor of Medicine at the University of Leeds, Director of the Molecular Medicine Institute at St James's University Hospital, and a former Chief Executive of Cancer Research UK.

Academic career
Markham graduated from the University of Birmingham with a BSc in Chemistry in 1971 and a PhD, also in Chemistry, in 1974. He qualified in Medicine in 1985 at the Universities of London and Oxford.

Markham has been one of the pioneers of molecular genetics research in the UK from the late 1980s.  His work has included the development of DNA Fingerprinting, work which received the Queen's Award for Technological Achievement in 1990.  He has been Professor of Medicine at the University of Leeds since 1993.

Markham serves on a number of Advisory Panels for the Medical Research Council and the Department of Health. He is Chairman of the Office for the Strategic Coordination of Health Research (OSCHR) Translational Medicine Board.

He is a fellow of the Academy of Medical Sciences and a former Chairman of the National Cancer Research Institute.

Personal life
Markham's wife Dr Lisa Brown, Lady Markham, is an expert biochemist and a member of the British Toxicology Society.  She works as a Chartered Patent Attorney. The couple live in Leeds with their children Grace and James.

Honours
Markham received a knighthood in the 2008 New Year Honours for services to medicine.

He has been awarded honorary degrees from:
  
 University of Surrey
 University of Stirling  (D.Univ) on 7 November 2008   
 University of Leeds (D.Sc) in 2006 
 University of Brighton (MD) in Summer 2012 
 University of Birmingham (D.Univ) in 2013

Charitable work
Professor Markham sits on the boards of many charities, including:

 Arthritis Research UK
 The Candlelighters Trust
 The Foulkes Foundation 
 The Wellcome Trust

References

Living people
British molecular biologists
Knights Commander of the Order of the British Empire
Academics of the University of Leeds
Alumni of the University of Birmingham
1950 births